Yadollah Kaboli Khansari (born 1949) is a calligrapher from Khansar, Iran.  He is a member of the board of The Trustees of the Society of Iranian Calligraphists and also holds a First Degree art Certificate.

Published books

1982 Broken Script and How to read it
1986 Sense Qalam, A Guidebook on the Broken Script
1989 Mehrab Khial, a collection of choice works
1990 Kelk Sheidaei Crosswise style in Broken Script.
1990 Bagh Nazar collection of choice works Broken Script.
1992 Quatrains of Baba Taher
1994 Naghsh Shough, collection of choice works
1995 Monhanie Eshg (collection of choice works)
1997 Dowlat-e-Ghoran (collection National Exhibition)

International exhibitions
1975 British Exhibition (London)
1984 Pakistan exhibition (Islamabad-Karachi- Lahour)
1988 International commemoration of Hales Shirazi, France, Paris.
1991-2 Iranology Exhibition at Columbia University. (New York)
1992 Iranian Art Exhibition U.A.E.(Dubai-abo Dhab.)
1993 Exhibition in France (Paris)
1996 Italy Rome in the Iran House in FAQ.
1997 Exhibition in Turkmenistsn
1997 Exhibition in USA
1998 Exhibition Spain Madrid
2001 Exhibition in USA

References

Iranian calligraphers
People from Khansar
1949 births
Living people
Iranian Science and Culture Hall of Fame recipients in Visual Arts